Chung Kin Hei (born 20 September 1972 in Hong Kong) is a retired Hong Kong footballer, who played in the left back position.

Honours
With Convoy Sun Hei
Hong Kong First Division League: 2001-02, 2003–04, 2004–05
Hong Kong League Cup: 2002-03, 2003–04, 2004–05
Hong Kong Senior Shield: 2004-05
Hong Kong FA Cup: 2002-03, 2004–05, 2005–06

References
Chung Kin Hei at HKFA
 

1972 births
Living people
Hong Kong footballers
Association football defenders
Happy Valley AA players
Yee Hope players
Sun Hei SC players
Hong Kong First Division League players